"Vamos a la Discoteca" is a song by Belgian group Paradisio. It was released in 1997 as the third single from their debut album, Paradisio (1997). It is a reworked song from their first release in 1995, "Un Clima Ideal", with the same lyrics, and was a Top 5 hit in both Finland and Sweden.

Chart performance
"Vamos a la Discoteca" was successful on the charts in Europe. It made it to the Top 10 in Denmark, Finland (number three), Italy, Norway and Sweden (number three). Additionally, it was a Top 20 hit in Belgium and France, while it hit number 21 on the Eurochart Hot 100 in August 1997.

Music video
A music video was made to accompany the song. It was filmed on Harbour Island in the Bahamas. The video was later published on YouTube in March 2012. By September 2020, it had more than 1,9 million views.

Track listings

 12", Belgium (1997)
 "Vamos a la Discoteca" (Club Extended Mix) — 8:53
 "Vamos a la Discoteca" (Video Edit Mix) — 3:53

 12" - Remix, France (1997)
 "Vamos a la Discoteca" (Rio Club Remix) — 6:13
 "Vamos a la Discoteca" (Club Extended Mix) — 8:53

 CD single, Belgium (1997)
 "Vamos a la Discoteca" (Video Edit Mix) — 3:53
 "Vamos a la Discoteca" (Instrumental Mix) — 3:53

 CD maxi, Europe (1997)
 "Vamos a la Discoteca" (Holiday Party Remix) — 6:02 	
 "Vamos a la Discoteca" (Rio Club Remix) — 6:13 	
 "Vamos a la Discoteca" (Original Club Extended Mix) — 8:53 	
 "Vamos a la Discoteca" (Hypnotyka Sun Remix) — 5:38 	
 "Vamos a la Discoteca" (Video Edit Mix) — 3:53

Charts

Weekly charts

Year-end charts

Certifications and sales

References

1997 singles
1997 songs
Paradisio songs